The Department of Civil Security  (Sinhala: සිවිල් ආරක්ෂක දෙපාර්තමේන්තුව Sivil ārakshaka depathamentuwā; Tamil: சிவில் பாதுகாப்பு துறை) (also known as the Civil Defence Force) is an auxiliary force administrated by the Ministry of Defence. 

It traces its roots to the Home Guards which were lightly armed local volunteers organized to protect their villages from attacks by the LTTE. These units were formed into the National Home Guard Service in 1986 under the Mobilization of Supplementary Force Act No. 40 of 1985. These home-guardsmen came under the command of the local police becoming one of two paramilitary units under the Sri Lanka Police. The Home Guard Service was re-structured on under the Gazette notification No. 1462/20 of 13 September 2006 which established the Civil Security Department (CSD). The CSD is headed by a Director General, currently held by Major General  N.R. Lamahewage (Rtd).  

The CDS is not to be confused with the Sri Lanka National Guard, which is a volunteer reserve regiment of the Sri Lanka Army.

Functions
The original role of the CDS was the protection of "threatened villages" also known as "border villages" that were adjacent to LTTE held areas most of which are in Puttlam, Anuradhapura, Vavuniya, Trincomalee, Polonnaruwa, Ampara and Monaragala Districts. However the role later expanded to protecting important sites and supply routes.

The main roles of the CDS are,
To serve as auxiliary to the police and the military to aid in the maintenance of internal security,
To serve in static defensive duties such as manning checkpoints, guarding low priority buildings or installations, guarding villages, etc. during time of war,
To proved security for government buildings and instutions,
To function as an emergency force intended for special tasks directly or indirectly connected with the defense of the country, and
To help the community in any kind of emergency, such as a natural disaster.

Other, more special duties include:
Providing security to centers of economic importance during time of war,
Protecting supply routes during time of war.

History and establishment

The start of the Sri Lankan civil war saw attacks by the LTTE on "border villages" (villages bordering the edges of the frontlines), causing considerable civilian casualties. Villagers began organising themselves into Home Guards, wherein local volunteers were initially armed with shotguns by the government, to help defend low priority rural areas that could not be held or protected by the armed forces without compromising the frontlines. The National Home Guard Service was thus established in 1986 by then Minister of National Security Lalith Athulathmudali with a strength of about 5000 personnel, armed with 12 gauge shotguns and brown uniforms. No allowances were paid initially, but some rations were issued through co-operative outlets. Subsequent to the takeover by the Police, the volunteers were paid a daily allowance and provided training at Kumbuka camp, Horana.

In 1988 guardswomen were allowed to volunteer, and 1993 saw the first issue of automatic rifles to the Home Guard. However they were not very well organised, trained, or motivated resulting in many villages being massacred by LTTE raids. Further during the 2002 ‘'Ceasefire Agreement" their importance was reduced and were given non-security duties.

In April 2006 due the resumption of the conflict and LTTE raids the then Secretary of Defence, Gotabaya Rajapaksa reformed the organisation renaming it into the Civil Defence Force, followed by the establishment of the Department of Civil Security on 1 January 2007 (through gazette notification No. 1462/20 of 13 September 2006) to oversee it. The first Director General of the Civil Defence Force was Rear Admiral Sarath Weerasekara.

Functions of the Department of Civil Security  were established to be:
Taking actions as a supplementary force for aiding and assisting the armed forces and police service, depending on the prevailing security status in the country,
Taking action to safeguard villages, properties, and cities where terrorist threats are present,
Assisting the police and armed forces to maintain law and order,
Engaging in security duties on instances of national events and any other important occasions,
Assisting with disaster mitigation and relief efforts,
Assisting with social welfare activities,
Carrying out any special duties specified by the President, line ministries or the government, and
Operation of a Civil Security Department Headquarters.
The numbers employed increased to 41,500 from just 19,200 and a month-long military training regime under Army and Navy Instructors was introduced. Further, two types of uniforms (similar to military uniforms) were issued to guardsmen. Those in the most vulnerable places were even equipped with night vision equipment. Since then, members of the force have been deployed outside their home villages to maintain public security, including within the capital Colombo. By May 2009 near the end of the war 80% of the Main Supply Routes and 75% of the Forward Defence Lines were guarded by the CDF as well as major religious places such as Sri Maha Bodhiya and Dalada Maligawa as well as crucial economic targets. 

Rear Admiral Sarath Weerasekara with the approval of the Defence Secretary formed a special elite unit called ‘Nandimithra' named after one of the Ten Giant Warriors. The elite unit consisted of four-man groups from almost all vulnerable villages that were special commando training for ten weeks including ambushes, night fighting, un-armed combat including Angampora. They waited in pathways leading to villages and ambushed LTTE forces that attempted to target villagers and their success deterred terrorist attacks. Unlike the rest of CDF whose duty was to hold off the enemy protecting civilians until reinforcement arrive Nandimithra units launched limited offensives just outside the threatened villages.

In the post-war period, CSD personnel are involved in community service projects, including agriculture, social welfare development, animal husbandry, and construction projects.

Ranks
Current ranks 
District Officer
Leader
Sub Leader
Civil Guard

Former ranks
District Officer
Warden
Sub Warden
Home Guard

Training
Training is provided in two stages: basic training is provided by the Sri Lankan Army at various army training centres, usually for 2–4 weeks, while periodical training is carried out by mobile training units in the areas where units are deployed.

Equipment
Type 56-2 assault rifle
FN FAL
Heckler & Koch G3
Glock 17

Former Director-Generals 
 Rear Admiral Sarath Weerasekara
 Major General Nandana Senadeera

References

External links 
Official website of the Civil Security Department
Official website of the Ministry of Defence
Homeguard page

 
Paramilitary organisations based in Sri Lanka
Civil Security
Military units and formations of Sri Lanka
Military units and formations established in 1986